The 2010 Bowling Green Falcons football team was the 92nd varsity football team to represent Bowling Green State University and the program's 58th season in the Mid-American Conference. The Falcons play in the MAC's east division and are led by second year head coach Dave Clawson. They played their home games at Doyt Perry Stadium. They finished the season 2–10, 1–7 in MAC play to finish in a three-way tie for fifth place in the East Division.

Preseason
In early July 2010, Falcon Sports Properties secured a three-year agreement with Toledo's ESPN Radio affiliate WLQR (1470 AM) to carry all Bowling Green Falcons football games, as well as a partial men's basketball schedule.  As part of the agreement, WLQR will air daily shows as well as coaches' show for both teams.  With the addition of WLQR, the Falcon Sports Network to seven stations across northwest Ohio.

At the 2010 Mid-American Conference Media Day, Bowling Green was picked to finish fourth in the conference's East Division.  The Falcons are expected to finish behind Temple, Ohio and Kent State

Key losses
The following are some of the key players who will be no longer eligible to play in the 2010 season:

Offense:
 Scott Albert (OL)
 Freddie Barnes (WR)
 Chris Bullock (RB)
 Toby Hunter (QB)
 Brady Minturn (OL)
 Tyrone Pronty (WR)
 Jimmy Scheidler (TE)
 Tyler Sheehan (QB)
 Shane Steffy (OL)
 Chris Wright (WR)

Defense:
 Cody Basler (LB)
 Jahmal Brown (DB)
 Giovanni Fillari (DB)
 Brandon Jackson (LB)
 P. J. Mahone (DB)
 Jarrett Sanderson (LB)
 James Schneider (LB)
 Roger Williams (DB)

Special teams:
 Nick Iovinelli (P)
 Craig Rutherford (LS)

Recruiting

Schedule

Game summaries

at Troy

1st Quarter
 8:54 BGSU Geter 35-yard run (Wright kick) 7-0 BGSU
 7:06 TROY Bruce 38-yard pass from Robinson (Taylor kick) 7-7 Tied
 1:49 BGSU Hodges 3-yard pass from Schilz (Wright kick) 14-7 BGSU

2nd Quarter
 10:23 BGSU Wright 19-yard field goal 17-7 BGSU
 7:39 TROY Taylor 26-yard field goal 17-10 BGSU
 1:17 TROY Southward 1-yard run (Taylor kick) 17-17 Tied

3rd Quarter
 14:07 BGSU Cooper 63-yard punt return (Wright kick) 24-17 BGSU
 12:52 TROY Jernigan 49-yard run (Taylor kick) 24-24 Tied
 8:45 TROY Taylor 40-yard field goal 27-24 TROY
 2:11 BGSU Wright 23-yard field goal 27-27 Tied

4th Quarter
 0:04 TROY Taylor 34-yard field goal 30-27 TROY

References

Bowling Green
2010
Bowling Green Falcons football